Let Us Now Praise Famous Men is a book with text by American writer James Agee and photographs by American photographer Walker Evans, first published in 1941 in the United States. The work documents the lives of impoverished tenant farmers during the Great Depression. Although it is in keeping with Evans's work with the Farm Security Administration, the project was initiated not by the FSA, but by Fortune magazine. The title derives from a passage in the Wisdom of Sirach (44:1) that begins, "Let us now praise famous men, and our fathers that begat us".

Background

Let Us Now Praise Famous Men grew out of an assignment that Agee and Evans accepted in 1936 to produce a Fortune article on the conditions among sharecropper families in the American South during the Great Depression. It was the time of U.S. President Franklin Roosevelt's "New Deal" programs designed to help the poorest segments of the society. Agee and Evans spent eight weeks that summer researching their assignment, mainly among three white sharecropping families mired in desperate poverty. They returned with Evans's portfolio of stark images—of families with gaunt faces, adults and children huddled in bare shacks before dusty yards in the Depression-era nowhere of the deep south—and Agee's detailed notes. His piece, however, was rejected by the editors at Fortune; but the following year the magazine gave Agee permission to publish his Alabama research in a book. The manuscript was accepted for publication by Houghton Mifflin in 1939 and appeared two years later.

As he writes in the book's preface, the original assignment was to produce a "photographic and verbal record of the daily living and environment of an average white family of tenant farmers". However, as the Literary Encyclopedia points out, "Agee ultimately conceived of the project as a work of several volumes to be entitled Three Tenant Families, though only the first volume, Let Us Now Praise Famous Men, was ever written". Agee considered that the larger work, though based in journalism, would be "an independent inquiry into certain normal predicaments of human divinity".

Agee as a character
Agee, who writes modestly and self-consciously about his privileged position in the book's creation, appears as a character himself at times in the narrative, as when he agonizes over his role as "spy" and intruder into these humble lives. At other times, as when he simply lists the contents of a sharecropper's shack or the meager articles of clothing they have to wear on Sunday, he is altogether absent. The strange ordering of books and chapters, the titles that range from mundane ("Clothes") to "radically artistic" (as the New York Times put it), the direct appeals by Agee for the reader to see the humanity and grandeur of these horrible lives, and his suffering at the thought that he cannot accomplish his appointed task, or should not, for the additional suffering it inflicts on his subjects, are all part of the book's character.

Impact
Scholars have noted that the book's ambitious scale and rejection of traditional reporting runs parallel with the creative, non-traditional programs of the U.S. government under Roosevelt. Agee argues with literary, political, and moral traditions that might mean nothing to his subjects but which are important for the larger audience and the larger context of examining others' lives.

Let Us Now Praise Famous Men sold only half its press run following publication, but since then has won high praise over the years and is routinely studied in the U.S. as a source of both journalistic and literary innovation. Reading the book inspired Aaron Copland to write his opera, The Tender Land. David Simon, journalist and creator of the television series The Wire, credited the book with impacting him early in his career and informing his practice of journalism.

Pseudonyms
Throughout the book, Agee and Evans use pseudonyms to obscure the identity of the three tenant farmer families. This convention is retained in the 1989 follow-up book by D. Maharidge and M. Williamson And Their Children After Them: The Legacy of "Let us now praise famous men" : James Agee, Walker Evans, and the Rise and Fall of Cotton in the South. However Evans's photos that are archived in the Library of Congress American Memory Project have the original names of the photographic subjects.

* There is disagreement over whether the family name is properly spelled Tengle or Tingle. The Library of Congress's spelling is used here.

Radio adaptation
In 1966 the Canadian Broadcasting Corporation aired the 135-minute dramatic feature, Let Us Now Praise Famous Men, George Whalley's adaptation of the book. The broadcast was produced by John Reeves, who has written about the radio production.

See also
 They Live on the Land

References

External links
 Let Us Now Praise Famous Men Houghton Mifflin (2001). 
 Fortune Magazines David Whitford returns to Hale County Alabama
 Maharidge, D. and Williamson, M.(1989).  And their children after them : the legacy of Let us now praise famous men. New York: Pantheon. 1990 Pulitzer Prize for General Non-Fiction.
 A Grand Lady and Some Famous Men - Some brief notes on the sequel, with modern-day photographs, by the Marion Military Institute's Archivist

1941 non-fiction books
Photographic collections and books
Houghton Mifflin books
Alabama culture
Non-fiction books about the Great Depression
New Deal in Alabama